Teslim Kolawole Folarin  (born October 1963) is a Nigerian politician, he is the gubernatorial candidate of the All Progressives Congress in Oyo State for the 2023 gubernatorial election. He is currently the senator representing Oyo Central senatorial district in the 9th National Assembly.

Early life and education
Folarin is a son of Alhaji and Alhaja Hamzat Folarin. He stemmed from Baale House in Oja Igbo area of Ibadan North-East Local Government area of Oyo State. Folarin is the Head (Mogaji) of his family House and a ranked traditional Chief in Ibadanland. He is the Laguna Olubadan of Ibadanland.

Folarin attended primary school in Lagos; his secondary education was completed at Nigeria's premier secondary school, Methodist Boys High School. Folarin holds a B.Sc. (Hons) degree in political science from the University of Ibadan and a diploma degree from Harvard University, USA. He spent some years gathering valuable civil service experience in the UK, including management roles at the Department of Trade in London before returning to Nigeria in 2002. Folarin performed his obligatory NYSC tenure in Kaduna and joined politics thereafter.

Political career
Folarin contested and won the senatorial seat to represent Oyo Central in 2003 at the age of 39 years on the platform of the PDP and was re-elected for a second term in 2007 on the platform of the same PDP. Folarin remains the only legislator in Oyo State who has served two terms at the Senate. At the Senate, he was appointed Leader of the Senate. Folarin also served on the Senate Committee on Business & Rules, Marines and Transport although his particular interests were in education, power supply and water resources. Folarin was involved in the Power probe in 2008. As the Leader of the Senate, he led debates on all Executives Bills and sponsored several private Bills himself. These included the Insurance Act, Armed Forces Pension Act and several others.

Folarin won the gubernatorial ticket of his party, Peoples Democratic Party (PDP) in 2014. He lost the election to the incumbent Governor Senator Abiola Ajimobi of the All Progressive Congress.

Folarin defected to the opposition party All Progressive Congress in December 2017.
Folarin was elected as the All Progressive Congress(APC) Oyo South senatorial candidate on September, 2018.

Folarin won the senatorial position in the 2019 Oyo central senatorial district election defeating the incumbent senator, Mrs. Monsurat Sunmonu and other candidates. He is the Chairman of the Senate Committee on Local Content in the 9th Senate. He also sits on several other committees including National Intelligence, INEC, Interparliamentary, Constitutional Review, Finance, Sustainable Development Goal (SDG) and Airforce.

Personal life
Folarin is married with children to Barr. Angela Folarin.

References

Living people
1963 births
Oyo State
Peoples Democratic Party members of the Senate (Nigeria)
University of Ibadan alumni
Yoruba politicians
Methodist Boys' High School alumni
21st-century Nigerian politicians